Colours is a solitaire card game which is played using a deck of playing cards. Its gameplay puts it on the same family as Sir Tommy, Strategy, and Calculation. 

Colours is so called because of its emphasis on colour. The game is a variation of the solitaire game Lady Betty.

Rules
The cards are shuffled, then dealt out one by one the foundations or onto one of six waste piles, the top cards of which are available for building only on the foundations.

A two, a three, a four, and a five are needed to start the foundations. The deuce and the four should be of one colour (regardless of suit) and the trey and the five be of the other colour. Naturally, the colour of the first foundation card that turns up during dealing dictates the colours of the other cards. The foundations are built up by colour.

Dealing of cards from the stock continues until the stock runs out. The game is won when all of the cards are built onto the foundations, which should have an ace, a deuce, a trey, and a four on top.

Variations 
Lady Betty is more like Sir Tommy in that it requires you to build the foundations by suit rather than colour, but like Colours it gives two extra tableau piles to work with.

Sources:
 Dalton, Basil.  The Complete Patience Book
 Hervey, George F.  Enjoying Card Games for One
 Parlett, David.  The Penguin Book of Patience

See also
  Sir Tommy
 List of solitaires
 Glossary of solitaire

Single-deck patience card games
Planners (games)